The Bulls Bay Lighthouse is a former lighthouse on Bulls Island in Charleston County, South Carolina. Its first lighthouse was built in 1852. After it was destroyed in 1897, a new light was built in 1900. It was deactivated in 1913.

Bulls Island is a barrier island that is part of the Cape Romain National Wildlife Refuge. It can be reached by private ferry from Awendaw, South Carolina.

The original lighthouse had its lantern mounted on top of the lightkeeper's brick house. This was destroyed in 1897. It was replaced in 1900 with a metal skeletal tower. The light station was deactivated in 1913.

References
 

Buildings and structures in Charleston County, South Carolina
Lighthouses in South Carolina
Lighthouses completed in 1852
Lighthouses completed in 1900
1852 establishments in South Carolina